The W68 warhead was the warhead used on the UGM-73 Poseidon SLBM missile.  It was developed in the late 1960s at Lawrence Livermore National Laboratory.

Specifications

The design was revolutionary and impacted many following systems with its achievements in warhead miniaturization.

The W68 had four fuzing options: low altitude radar with contact backup, high altitude radar with timer backup, high altitude timer with impact backup and impact fuzing.

Production and deployment
A total of 5,250 W68 warheads were produced, the single largest production run of any American nuclear weapon model. It was manufactured starting in June 1970 and ending in June 1975. Each Poseidon missile could carry up to 14 warheads; at the peak deployment, there were 31 US Poseidon submarines with 16 missiles each, for a total of 496 deployed missiles, at a density of about 10 warheads per missile.

Safety issues and later service
Aging of the LX-09 polymer-bonded explosive used in the W68 led to decomposition of the explosive, separating the binder and plasticizer, which then caused deterioration of the detonators. This required the whole production run to be retired or remanufactured with LX-10 and LX-10-1 as new explosives from November 1978 through 1983; about 2,000 units were retired starting in 1977 rather than rebuilt.

The remaining 3,200 warheads remained in service longer, with the last units retired in 1991.

See also
 UGM-73 Poseidon
 List of nuclear weapons

References

External links
 Allbombs.html list of all US nuclear weapons at nuclearweaponarchive.org
 Lawrence Livermore Labs accomplishments in the 1970s

Nuclear warheads of the United States
Military equipment introduced in the 1970s